Jáchym Bulín (7 September 1934 – 25 May 2021) was a Czech ski jumper. He competed in the individual event at the 1956 Winter Olympics.

References

External links
 

1934 births
2021 deaths
Czechoslovak male ski jumpers
Czech male ski jumpers
Olympic ski jumpers of Czechoslovakia
Ski jumpers at the 1956 Winter Olympics
People from Jelenia Góra